The Complete Recordings is a compilation album by American Delta blues musician Robert Johnson. The 41 songs were recorded in two sessions in Dallas and San Antonio, Texas for the American Record Company (ARC) during 1936 and 1937. Most were first released on 78 rpm records in 1937.  The Complete Recordings, released August 28, 1990, by Columbia Records, contains every recording Johnson is known to have made, with the exception of an alternate take of "Travelling Riverside Blues".

The Complete Recordings peaked at number 80 on the Billboard 200 chart. The album sold more than a million copies, and won a Grammy Award in 1991 for "Best Historical Album." In 1992, the Blues Foundation inducted the album into the Blues Hall of Fame. It also was included by the National Recording Preservation Board in the Library of Congress' National Recording Registry in 2003.  Eric Clapton and Keith Richards contributed to the album liner notes with essays on Johnson's influence on their music.

Background and recording
Prior to his death in 1938, through the help of H. C. Speir Johnson recorded 29 songs for the American Record Company (ARC). His complete canon of recordings includes these 29 masters, plus 13 surviving alternate takes, all recorded at two ARC sessions held in San Antonio and Dallas, Texas. The Mississippi Delta—two hundred miles of fertile lowlands stretching from Memphis, Tennessee, in the north to Vicksburg, Mississippi, in the south—was one of the primary locales in which the blues originated and developed. He is said to have been heavily influenced by early blues artists like Skip James, who was recorded in 1931, around the same time that Johnson amazed his elders with his mastery of the guitar. James's eerie, distinctive style is reflected throughout Johnson's recordings, most notably in "32-20 Blues," which he adapted from James's "22-20 Blues."

Johnson's first session in San Antonio took place over three days – November 23, 26, and 27, 1936. Sixteen songs were recorded in the Gunter Hotel, where ARC had set up equipment to record several musical artists. "Kind Hearted Woman Blues" was the first song recorded. Also captured in San Antonio were "I Believe I'll Dust My Broom" and "Sweet Home Chicago," both of which became post-war blues standards. "Terraplane Blues," known for its metaphoric lyrics, became a regional hit and Johnson's signature song. Most of the selections were released on Vocalion 78 rpm records, but three songs and several interesting alternate takes remained unissued until they appeared on the Columbia albums. Six months later, on June 19 and 20, 1937, other recording sessions took place at the Warner Brothers/Vitagraph Building in Dallas where, once again, ARC had set up its recording equipment to capture many different musicians. This time 13 songs were recorded and 10 were released during the following year.

Reception and influence

While Robert Johnson's professional recording career can be measured in months, his musical legacy has survived more than 70 years. Muddy Waters and Howlin' Wolf, the two most prominent Chicago bluesmen of the 1950s, both had their roots in the Delta: Muddy was influenced by Johnson's records, and Wolf worked with Johnson around the Delta area. Johnson's emotive vocals, combined with his varied and masterful guitar playing, continue to influence blues and popular music performers to this day.

The Chicago Tribunes Greg Kot wrote that The Complete Recordings, along with Clapton's The Layla Sessions (1990), survive as "monuments of 20th Century music that will rarely, if ever, be equaled".

In 2012, the album was ranked number 22 on Rolling Stone magazine's list of the 500 greatest albums of all time.

Track listing
For recording dates and original releases, see Robert Johnson recordings.

Personnel
 Robert Johnson – acoustic guitar, vocals
 Don Law – original recording producer
 Vincent Liebler – original recording engineer
 Laurence Cohen – Columbia "Roots ‘n’ Blues Series" producer
 Frank Driggs – reissue producer
 Stephen LaVere – reissue producer

1995 rerelease
The Penguin Guide to Blues Recordings reports that a 1995 rerelease of the album had improved sound, resulting from better source material and remastering. In addition to a maximum four-star rating, the guide awarded this reissue a “crown”, indicating a CD of exceptional merit.

2011 reissue
A new remastered edition of the album was released in 2011 in commemoration of Johnson's 100th birthday. The Centennial Collection was released in both standard and deluxe editions. The track order was changed so that all of the alternate takes were placed at the end of the discs, rather than side by side with the master tracks—as the 1990 release had placed them. Included on this edition, is a previously unissued take of "Traveling Riverside Blues" (DAL.400-1) which was previously thought to be one of nineteen Robert Johnson Recordings that were lost or destroyed.  It was found in the archives of Alan Lomax, which had been purchased by the American Folklife Center of the Library of Congress.

See also
 King of the Delta Blues Singers
 King of the Delta Blues Singers, Vol. II

References

External links
 The Complete Recordings at Discogs
 Robert Johnson: Once Largely Myth, Now a Hit at The New York Times

1990 compilation albums
Robert Johnson albums
Blues compilation albums
Columbia Records compilation albums
Grammy Award for Best Historical Album
United States National Recording Registry recordings